Mynydd Llandygái (also spelt Mynydd Llandegai, ; from Welsh mynydd "mountain", Llandygai "Church of St Tegai") is a small, partly forested hill in Gwynedd, North Wales. It forms the start of the Glyderau ridge.

Many of the houses are spread along long roads rather than clustered around a point, giving the village a somewhat decentralised feel. However the village is distinguished by two parallel rows of semi-detached quarrymen's cottages constructed during the 19th century for workers of Penrhyn Quarry, which mined slate. The first mention of housing on the site can be found in the census of 1841. Each of the houses was provided with an area of land (approximately 1 acre) sufficient to feed the family. This arrangement is clearly visible on the map of the area. This can be contrasted with the situation in the South Wales coalfields or in the industrial Midlands where no such provision was made for the workers.

Originally named Douglas Hill, the name was changed in the 1930s after the inhabitants decided that they did not want to associate with the name Douglas, namely part of the Penrhyn family surname. (See Baron Penrhyn.)

Physically the village has changed little since it was originally built.

The area to the south is mountainous and there are a number of slate and stone quarries in the vicinity.

External links

 Neuadd Goffa / Memorial Hall
 Mynydd Llandygai Garden Festival
 Geograph : Photographs of Mynydd Llandygai

Villages in Gwynedd
Llandygai